Sunview is an unincorporated community in Green Township, Madison County, Indiana.

Geography

References

Unincorporated communities in Madison County, Indiana
Unincorporated communities in Indiana
Indianapolis metropolitan area